Boaz Kiplagat Lalang (born 8 February 1989) is a Kenyan middle distance runner, who specialises in the 800 metres. His younger brother, Lawi Lalang, ran for the University of Arizona.

Career

At the 2008 Summer Olympics, Lalang barely missed running in the finals of the 800 m.

At the 2010 IAAF World Indoor Championships, he won a silver medal in the 800 m. He ran a mile personal best of 3:56.14 at the Drake Relays, defeating training partner and race favourite Bernard Lagat in the process and went on to lower his time to 3:52.18 in Oslo, Norway.

On 29 August 2010 he ran a personal best of 1:42.95 at the Rieti meeting in second place behind the new world record set by David Rudisha.

He studies Business Administration at Rend Lake College in Illinois. He has been mentored by Kenyan-born American runner Bernard Lagat

Competition record

Personal Bests
800 metres - 1:42.95 - Rieti, ITA, 29/08/2010
1000 Metres - 2:14.83 - Eugene, OR, 03/07/2010
1500 Metres - 3:35.80 - Rome, ITA, 10/06/2010
Mile - 3:52.18 - Oslo, NOR, 04/06/2010

References

External links

1989 births
Living people
Kenyan male middle-distance runners
Athletes (track and field) at the 2008 Summer Olympics
Commonwealth Games gold medallists for Kenya
Athletes (track and field) at the 2010 Commonwealth Games
Junior college men's track and field athletes in the United States
Commonwealth Games medallists in athletics
African Games silver medalists for Kenya
African Games medalists in athletics (track and field)
Athletes (track and field) at the 2011 All-Africa Games
Olympic athletes of Kenya
Medallists at the 2010 Commonwealth Games